William Hill (born April 21, 1959) is a former American football cornerback in the National Football League (NFL) for the Dallas Cowboys. He also was a member of the New Jersey Generals of the United States Football League (USFL). He played college football at the Rutgers University.

Early years
Hill attended Howell High School, where he played football and baseball. As a sophomore in 1974, he was named the starting running back. As a senior, he received All-Monmouth honors.

He recorded more than 1,000 rushing yards in three straight seasons, finishing his high school career with 3,147 rushing yards, 228 scored points and a punting average of 41.3 yards.

College career
Hill accepted a football scholarship from the University of Virginia. He left the school after suffering an injury and enrolled at Brookdale Community College to focus on playing baseball. As a sophomore in 1979, he received honorable-mention All-American honors as an outfielder and was selected by the New York Mets in the 16th round (#392 overall) of the 1979 Amateur Entry Draft.

After participating one season in the New York–Penn League, he walked-on at Rutgers University, to practice football under head coach Frank R. Burns. In his only season with the team in 1980, he played cornerback, while registering 37 tackles, one interception, one carry for 13 yards and 8 kickoff returns for 177 yards (22.1-yard avg.).

Professional career

Cleveland Browns
Hill was signed as an undrafted free agent by the Cleveland Browns after the 1981 NFL Draft. He was released before the start of the season.

New Jersey Generals (USFL)
On January 15, 1985, he signed as a free agent with the New Jersey Generals of the United States Football League. He was later released and re-signed on March 21. He started in some of the games at cornerback. He didn't get a chance to play in 1986 after the league folded.

Dallas Cowboys
After the NFLPA strike was declared on the third week of the 1987 season, those contests were canceled (reducing the 16-game season to 15) and the NFL decided that the games would be played with replacement players. In September, he was signed to be a part of the Dallas Cowboys replacement team that was given the mock name "Rhinestone Cowboys" by the media. He was a backup at right cornerback behind Robert Williams. He was released after the strike ended on October 26.

Personal life
Hill was a football head coach at Toms River High School South, Asbury Park High School, and Howell High School. Hill has earned a record of 11-39 as a head football coach.

References

1959 births
Living people
Howell High School (New Jersey) alumni
Sportspeople from Monmouth County, New Jersey
Players of American football from New Jersey
Baseball players from New Jersey
American football cornerbacks
Virginia Cavaliers football players
Brookdale Jersey Blues baseball players
Rutgers Scarlet Knights football players
New Jersey Generals players
Dallas Cowboys players
National Football League replacement players
High school football coaches in New Jersey
People from Neptune Township, New Jersey